The National Law School of India Review is a student-run, peer-reviewed, bi-annual law review published by the Student Advocate Committee of the National Law School of India University.

History 
The journal was established in 1988 as the Student Bar Review. It obtained its current name in 2007. Notable authors include Justice B.N. Srikrishna (former Judge, Supreme Court of India), Rajeev Dhawan, Fali Nariman, and P.P. Rao (senior advocates).

Citations 
The journal has been cited in various publications and the only student-run journal to be cited by the Supreme Court of India in cases of Action Committee, Un-Aided Pvt. Schools & Ors.Vs. Director of Education, Delhi, the Right to Privacy verdict and Union of India v. M/s Mohit Minerals.

See also 
 Legal periodical

References

External links 
 

Indian law journals
Biannual journals
English-language journals
Publications established in 1988